Surman (ˈsɝːmən; also spelled Sorman or Serman;  {{Lang-ber|  ⵙⵓⵕⵎⴰⵏ}}) is a city in the former Tripolitania region in northwestern Libya, situated  to the west of Tripoli on the Mediterranean coast. While it borders Sabrata in West, Yafren in south, Az zawia in the east and the southeast. With a population of about 90,000.
The city has earned its place as one of the biggest hotspots of Libya in many trade areas.

Libyan civil wars
On 20 June 2011, during the first Libyan Civil War, NATO strikes in Sorman against what appeared to be civilian homes in a compound belonging to one of Muammar Gaddafi's associates, Khaled K. El-Hamedi, reportedly killed several civilians, including two children and their mother. NATO admitted carrying out an air strike on a military target in Sorman but denied civilian deaths. NATO issued a statement that said a precision air strike was launched against a "high-level" command and control "node" in the Sorman area.

On 14 August, the National Liberation Army said it had captured the city in battle during the major coastal offensive. 10 rebel fighters were killed and at least 40 pro-Gaddafi fighters were captured during the battle for the town.

In March 2016, during the second civil war, it was reported that two Italians who had been kidnapped in June 2015 were killed while they were used as human shields by Islamic State gunmen in Sorman.

References

See also
 List of cities in Libya

 
Tripolitania
Baladiyat of Libya